is a Japanese footballer currently playing as a forward for Gainare Tottori.

Career statistics

Club
.

Notes

References

External links

2001 births
Living people
Sportspeople from Mie Prefecture
Association football people from Mie Prefecture
Japanese footballers
Association football forwards
J3 League players
Cerezo Osaka players
Gainare Tottori players